Hoplitendemis is a genus of moths belonging to the subfamily Olethreutinae of the family Tortricidae.

Species
Hoplitendemis centraspis Diakonoff, 1973
Hoplitendemis erebodes Diakonoff, 1973
Hoplitendemis inauditana Kuznetzov, 1988
Hoplitendemis pogonopoda Diakonoff, 1973

See also
List of Tortricidae genera

References

External links
tortricidae.com

Tortricidae genera
Olethreutinae
Taxa named by Alexey Diakonoff